The 2013–14 RB Leipzig season was the 5th season in the club's football history and their first season competing in the professional & national level in Germany. Leipzig participated in the 2013–14 3. Liga season after winning the promotion playoff.

Leipzig participated in the DFB-Pokal after winning the 2013 Saxony Cup. They were eliminated in the first round by FC Augsburg. Leipzig also participates in the 2014 Saxony Cup since 3. Liga teams are allowed to participate in regional cups. They were eliminated in the semifinal by FC Oberlausitz Neugersdorf.

Team uniform

Review and events

The 2013–14 RB Leipzig season is the 5th season in the club's football history and their first season competing in the professional & national level in Germany. Leipzig will participate in the 2013–14 3. Liga season after winning the 2012–13 Regionalliga Nordost and beating Sportfreunde Lotte in the promotion playoff.

They won their 3. Liga debut against Hallescher FC on 19 July by 1–0. The goalscorer was captain Daniel Frahn.

On 3 May 2014, they secured promotion to the 2. Bundesliga after defeating 1. FC Saarbrücken 5–1. They finished their first season in 3. Liga in second position, securing a direct promotion spot.

Fixtures and results

Legend

Friendlies

3. Liga

League fixtures and results

League table

DFB-Pokal

Saxony Cup

Squad

Squad, appearances and goals scored

|-
|colspan="10"|Players who left the club during the 2013–14 season
|-

|}

Transfers

In

Out

References

External links 
 2013–14 RB Leipzig players at redbulls.com 

Leipzig
RB Leipzig seasons